Goshenite is a colorless gem variety of beryl. It is called the mother of all gemstones because it can be transformed into other like emerald, morganite, or bixbite. Goshenite is also referred to as the purest form of beryl since there are generally no other elements present in the stone. The gem is used as imitation for diamond or emerald by adding colored foil on it.

Name 
Goshenite is named after Goshen, Massachusetts, United States, where it was first found. It is also known as white beryl or lucid beryl.

Value 
Goshenite is not popular in the jewelry industry because of its lack of color and it lacks brilliance, luster, or fire. It is also inexpensive due to the fact it is abundant.

Occurrence 
It is most commonly found inside granite. It can also be found in metamorphic rocks. Goshenite can be found in countries like China, Canada, Brazil, Russia, Mexico, Pakistan, the United States, and Madagascar.

References 

Beryl group
Gemstones